The 13th Pan American Games were held in Winnipeg, Manitoba, Canada from July 23 to August 8, 1999.

Medals

Gold

Men's Running Target (10m): Attila Solti

Women's Middleweight (– 67 kg): Heidy Juárez

Bronze

Men's Singles: Pedro Yang

Men's Featherweight (– 62 kg): Marvin Jiménez

Results by event

See also
 Guatemala at the 2000 Summer Olympics

Nations at the 1999 Pan American Games
P
1999